The Lenox Hotel is a hotel in Boston, Massachusetts, USA. It is located at the corner of Boylston and Exeter Streets; one block from Newbury Street, Copley Square, and the Prudential Tower. In addition, the Lenox sits next to the Boston Public Library.

The Lenox is a member of Historic Hotels of America, the official program of the National Trust for Historic Preservation.

History
The Lenox Hotel was built in 1900 by the owner of New York's Waldorf-Astoria, Lucias Boomer, at a cost of $1.1 million. At eleven stories high, it once stood as the tallest building in Boston. The outside was constructed of white and red terra cotta bricks and the inside of the hotel was luxuriously appointed. The hotel is named after the family of Lady Sarah Lennox, wife of King George III, who ruled before and during the American Revolution. The Lenox was host to many celebrities, including Enrico Caruso, who arrived at The Lenox in his own private railroad car. The area next to The Lenox was a railroad station until the 1960s, allowing affluent guests to pull their railroad cars up to the hotel and walk right in. Judy Garland, who made The Lenox her home for three months in 1965, currently has one of the hotel's suites named in her honor.  In 1963, the Saunders family acquired the hotel, and Roger Saunders was brought on as the general manager.

The Lenox Hotel is located less than a block from the finish line of the Boston Marathon, held every year in April.

Present day
The hotel recently underwent a $35 million renovation. Some of the corner suites in the hotel still have functioning wood-burning fireplaces. It is one of the few known buildings left in the world with a functioning Cutler mail chute.

Environmental initiatives
The Lenox Hotel and the Saunders Hotel Group are known internationally for pioneering the luxury green hotel movement since 1989. They have received a Presidential Gold Medal for Environmental Leadership from George H Bush in 1992 as well as many other international sustainability awards. The Lenox also has rooftop beehives which provide honey for menu and drink items in their restaurants; they separate food waste to be made into compost for local farms, they do renovations with sustainable materials and help improve IAQ (indoor air quality) by using healthier paints, adhesives and cleaning products. 

The Hotel purchase locally made goods to support area businesses while reducing polluting emissions from long-distance transportation. They continue to share their lessons learned and innovative ideas with hotels far and wide to help the world's largest service industry towards a more sustainable future.

Notable guests
Below is an alphabetical list of notable guests who have frequented The Lenox:
Red Auerbach, Boston Celtics coach, resided at The Lenox during training seasons.
Enrico Caruso stayed at The Lenox in 1907 and arrived via personal railroad car.
James Michael Curley, Boston mayor who died before fully paying his hotel bill. In the 1920s, his sons presented the hotel with a pair of portraits of George and Martha Washington to settle the overdue bill.
Judy Garland, who made The Lenox her home for three months in 1965, currently has one of the hotel's suites named in her honor.

References

Hotels in Boston
Copley Square
Hotels established in 1900
Hotel buildings completed in 1900
Railway hotels in the United States